Alfreda Hausner (born 27 December 1927) is an Austrian chess player who twice won the Austrian women's chess championship (1953, 1976).

Chess career
She was born in Carinthia but in 1938 her parents relocated to Vienna, where she lived whole life. Seriously started playing chess at the end of World War II. Two times won Austrian women's Chess Championships (1953, 1976) and participated in many international chess tournaments. Member of Vienna chess club Sz Favoriten Wien.

Hausner has played for Austria in 8 Chess Olympiads (1957, 1966, 1972-1976, 1980-1984) and won individual bronze medal at Reserve Board in 6th Women's Chess Olympiad (1974).

Successfully participated in the senior chess tournaments. In 1987 in Bad Wörishofen Hausner won a bronze medal at the World Women's Championships (S60+).

References

External links

1927 births
People from Wolfsberg
Austrian female chess players
Chess Olympiad competitors
Living people